Dance Council may refer to:

 Australian Dance Council, a national dance advocacy organisation for dancers, choreographers, directors and educators
 International Dance Council, an umbrella organization for all forms of dance in the world
 Pittsburgh Dance Council, a presenting organization based in downtown Pittsburgh, United States
 World Dance Council, a dance organization